Forget Mozart is a 1985 West German-Czechoslovak mystery film directed by Miloslav Luther and starring Armin Mueller-Stahl, Max Tidof and Wolfgang Preiss.

Following the death of Wolfgang Amadeus Mozart, a number of those who knew him are assembled to establish the cause of his death.

Main cast
Max Tidof as Wolfgang Amadeus Mozart
Armin Mueller-Stahl as Graf Pergen
Katharina Raacke as Constanze Mozart
Wolfgang Preiss as Baron Gottfried van Swieten
Uwe Ochsenknecht as Director Emanuel Schikaneder
Winfried Glatzeder as Antonio Salieri
Kurt Weinzierl as Doctor
 as Servant
Katja Flint as Magdalena Demel
Andrej Hryc as Franz Demel
Ladislav Chudík as Joseph Haydn
Zdenek Hradilák as Joseph II
Juraj Hrubant as Figaro
Andrej Malachovsky as Sarastro
 as Thorwald

Reception
Peter Keough of Chicago Reader wrote "In Forget Mozart, only the Mozart remains memorable".

References

External links

1985 films
1980s mystery films
West German films
Czech mystery films
German mystery films
1980s German-language films
Films about classical music and musicians
Films about composers
Films about Wolfgang Amadeus Mozart
Cultural depictions of Antonio Salieri
Cultural depictions of Joseph II, Holy Roman Emperor
Joseph Haydn
Films set in the 1790s
Films set in Vienna
1980s German films